Life Flight or LifeFlight often refers to air ambulance services. 

Life Flight may also refer to:

United States
Life Flight Network, an air ambulance serving Idaho, Montana, Oregon, and Washington
UMass Memorial Lifeflight, an air ambulance serving Massachusetts, part of UMass Memorial Health
Metro Life Flight, an air ambulance service out of Cleveland, Ohio
Life Flight (Geisinger), an air ambulance service in Pennsylvania
Memorial Hermann Life Flight, an air ambulance service in Houston, Texas

Other locations
LifeFlight Australia, an air ambulance service based in Queensland, Australia, known until July 2016 as CareFlight
LifeFlight (Nova Scotia), an air ambulance service based in Nova Scotia, Canada
Life Flight (New Zealand), an air ambulance service in New Zealand, subject of a reality series

Other uses
Life Flight (album), by trumpeter Freddie Hubbard

See also
 Lifelight